Grand is a St. Louis MetroLink station. The station consists of a single island platform situated beneath the Grand Boulevard viaduct. The station was renovated beginning in 2011 and reopened in late 2012.

The station is near Saint Louis University and Grand Center and connects to the region's busiest bus line on Grand Boulevard, the #70, which runs fully electric, articulated buses.

In 2012, Metro's Arts in Transit program commissioned the work Garden Under the Bridge by Barbara Grygutis for installation under the Grand Boulevard viaduct near the station. In the center of the transit plaza, two “seed pod forms” create a gateway to the station and illuminate the surrounding area with electric-blue light. LED lighting embedded in the pavers work in concert with this main sculpture.

Reconstruction

In March 2011, the station was temporarily closed to permit the demolition of the Grand Boulevard viaduct and the station's original 1993 elevator towers and stairs. A temporary station was employed while the bridge was replaced during an 18-24 month construction project. The project also included the construction of a new MetroLink station. The new expanded and improved station and transfer center on Scott Avenue underneath the completed viaduct opened on August 20, 2012.

Station layout
Grand is accessible by two elevators and sets of stairs that provide access to both northbound and southbound Grand Boulevard and a ramp on Scott Avenue.

References

External links
 St. Louis Metro
Grand Avenue entrance from Google Maps Street View

MetroLink stations in St. Louis
Railway stations in the United States opened in 1993
Red Line (St. Louis MetroLink)
Blue Line (St. Louis MetroLink)
Midtown St. Louis
1993 establishments in Missouri